Lamja Parshuram is a 1974 Indian Meitei language film directed by Aribam Syam Sharma and produced by G. Narayan Sharma for N.S. Films. The script was written by Elangbam Dinamani Singh and story by G.C. Tongbra. The movie features Kangabam Tomba in the titular role, and Wahengbam Bedamani as the lead female protagonist. It was released on 24 April 1974 at Pratap Talkies, Paona Bazar. The film ran for more than 100 days and became the first Manipuri  hit feature film.

The indoor shooting of the film was done at Calcutta Movietone Studio. Lamja Parshuram was processed by Gauri Mukherjee at United Cine Laboratory. Khun Joykumar wrote the credit titles for the film. It is the debut feature film directed by Aribam Syam Sharma. From the movie, the leading actor Kangabam Tomba has since been known popularly known as Lamja Tomba.

Synopsis
The theme of the film is about an orphan Parshuram who grows up on his own. His maternal uncle sells his mother to a cruel rich man. He perceives that all these happenings are caused by his father who neglects them.  And he takes a vow to kill his estranged father when he finds him. It is a heart touching journey of an orphan who always fights hardship.

(Meghachandra Kongbam, Imphal Review of Arts and Politics)

Cast
 Kangabam Tomba as Parshuram
 Wahengbam Bedamani as Indrani
 G. Narayan Sharma as Parshuram's father
 Yengkhom Roma as Parshuram's mother
 Huirem Manglem as Tomal
 Kshetrimayum Rashi as Kethabi
 Master Jayantakumar as Master Parshuram

Accolades
Kangabam Tomba won the Best Actor Award for his role in the film at the 1st Manipur State Film Awards 1984.

Soundtrack
Aribam Syam Sharma composed the soundtrack for the film and Khuraijam Phulendra Singh wrote the lyrics. The movie has four songs sung by Aheibam Syam Sharma, Chongtham Kamala, Khun Joykumar and Kshetrimayum Rashi. The gramophone records were done by H.M.V.

References

External links
 
 

1974 films
Meitei-language films
Indian black-and-white films
Films directed by Aribam Syam Sharma